The Sa'ar 6-class corvette is a series of four German-made corvettes ordered for the Israeli Navy in May 2015.

Development 
The ships' design is loosely based on the German , but with engineering changes to accommodate Israeli-built sensors and missiles such as the Barak 8  and the naval Iron Dome system. Elbit Systems has been awarded the contract to design and build the electronic warfare (EW) suites for the ships.

All four vessels were constructed in Germany in a joint project by German Naval Yards Holdings and ThyssenKrupp Marine Systems. The first of the class was scheduled to be delivered in 2020. Construction cost was estimated at NIS 1.8 billion Israeli new shekel (NIS) or roughly 430 million Euros ($480 million). Israel will pay for two thirds of the cost and the German Government will subsidize a third of the corvettes' construction costs, as with the s.

Missions 
The Lebanese Hezbollah group alleges that Israel's gas fields lie in Lebanese waters. It has threatened to target Israeli gas platforms. An Israeli-owned ship reportedly came under missile fire repeatedly near the United Arab Emirates. The ship was en route to the UAE from Kuwait, according to Channel 12 news.

The Sa'ar 6 has been adopted for maritime protection, anti-shipping and prevent threats in the Israeli exclusive economic zone (EEZ).The Sa'ar 6 is also used to defend Israeli shipping lanes in the Mediterranean to import more than 90 percent of goods for Israel. One of their roles will be to protect natural gas platforms in the Mediterranean Sea against possible sea-borne, counter-terrorism or rocket threats.

Characteristics 
It is armed with an Oto Melara 76 mm main gun, two Typhoon Weapon Stations, 16 vertical launch cells for Barak-8 surface-to-air missiles, 40 cells for the C-Dome point defense system, 16 anti-ship missiles Gabriel V, the EL/M-2248 MF-STAR AESA radar, and two  torpedo launchers. It has hangar space and a platform able to accommodate a medium class SH-60-type helicopter.

Israel received the first of four Sa'ar 6-class corvettes, on 11 December 2020;  Thyssen Krupp Marine Systems officially handed over the second corvette, on 4 May 2021. On July 27, 2021, the final two ships, INS Atzmaut and INS Nitzachon, were also delivered to the Israeli Navy by the builder.  They were to be equipped with radar and weapon systems by the Israeli Navy after their arrival in Israel. In Haifa in September 2022, the vessel's 76/62 rapid-fire main gun was ceremonially accepted for the first two ships of the class.

Ships of class

References

Further reading

External links
 
 

Corvette classes
 
Corvettes of the Israeli Navy